This is a list of American soccer clubs in international competitions. American clubs have participated in competitive international soccer competitions since 1963, when New York Hungaria entered the 1963 CONCACAF Champions' Cup.

Unlike other major professional sports leagues in the United States, the winners of Major League Soccer are not universally considered to be world champions in their respective sport. Yearly, MLS teams will compete against other soccer clubs abroad in competitions to determine the champions of North America, the Americas, and the world.

Since 1963, American soccer clubs have won three CONCACAF Champions' Cup/Champions League titles, and finished runners-up three times.

Who qualifies for CONCACAF competitions 
For the CONCACAF Champions League, four American soccer clubs are eligible for entry into the competition.

In past competitions, such as the North American SuperLiga, the best teams based on regular season record to not qualify for the Champions League participated. The tournament was held from 2007 to 2010.

Cups and finals

Competitive tournaments

CONCACAF Champions League / Champions' Cup

North American SuperLiga (defunct)

CONCACAF Cup Winners Cup / Giants Cup (defunct)

Copa Interamericana (defunct)

Leagues Cup

Friendly tournaments

Emirates Cup

International Champions Cup

La Manga Cup (defunct)

Pan-Pacific Championship (defunct)

Full international record 
Competitive tournaments only.

FIFA Club World Championship / Club World Cup

Copa Interamericana (defunct)

CONCACAF Champions' Cup / Champions League 

The competition was named CONCACAF Champions' Cup until 2008–09, when it switched its name to CONCACAF Champions League.

North American SuperLiga (defunct)

CONCACAF Cup Winners Cup / Giants Cup (defunct)

Campeones Cup

Leagues Cup

Copa Sudamericana

Copa Merconorte (defunct)

Appearances in CONCACAF competitions

As of March 11, 2021.

Notes

See also 
 MLS performance in the CONCACAF Champions League

References

External links
RSSSF

 
North American football clubs in international competitions
American soccer clubs records and statistics